Gia Lộc is a rural district of Hải Dương province in the Red River Delta region of Vietnam. As of 2003 the district had a population of 151,177. The district covers an area of 122 km². The district capital lies at Gia Lộc.

References

Districts of Hải Dương province